Longos is the smallest of the island ports on Paxoi, one of the Ionian Islands of Greece. At the 2011 census, its population was 81 for the village and 298 for the municipal district, which includes the villages Anemogiannatika, Dendiatika, Kagkatika, Kontogiannatika and Koutsi.

Population

Geography

Longos is situated on the northeast coast of the island, and has a small fishing harbour. There are several shops and bars. At one end of Longos harbour stands the tall chimney from an abandoned soap factory. There are several  shingle beaches nearby.

See also

List of settlements in the Corfu regional unit
Paxos

External links
Annual Paxos International Music Festival
Longos at the GTP Travel Pages
Paxoi Travel Guide

References

Populated places in Corfu (regional unit)